Andrew Lysaght may refer to:

 Andrew Lysaght Jr. (1873–1933), Australian politician
 Andrew Lysaght Sr. (1832–1906), Australian politician